Bahia Honda is a bay in La Guajira, Colombia on the Atlantic Ocean. The bay opens to the Caribbean Sea.

External links 
 Map of Bahia Honda

Bays of Colombia
Bays of the Caribbean
Geography of La Guajira Department